Craig David Button (24 November 1964 – 2 April 1997) was a United States Air Force captain who died when he crashed a Fairchild A-10 Thunderbolt II aircraft under mysterious circumstances on 2 April 1997. During the incident, Captain Button inexplicably flew hundreds of miles off-course without radio contact, appeared to maneuver purposefully and did not attempt to eject before the crash. His death is regarded as a suicide because no other hypothesis explains the events. The incident caused widespread public speculation about Button's intentions and whereabouts until the crash site was found three weeks later. The aircraft carried live bombs which have not been recovered.

Biography
Craig Button graduated from Wantagh High School in Wantagh, Long Island, New York. He began flying at age 17 and aspired to be a professional pilot. Button was described as "polite", "quiet" and a "perfectionist" who "rarely drank and never smoked". One of his instructors remarked that his shoes were always shined. Button's next-door neighbor growing up reports that he was "a ridiculously hard worker".

Button's father, Richard Button, was a retired lieutenant colonel in the United States Air Force (USAF). His mother, Joan Button, was a devout Jehovah's Witness. According to a letter written by Button, she raised him "to think that joining the military is wrong" and refused to allow him to wear his college Air Force Reserve Officer Training Corps (AFROTC) uniform at home. Button's half-sister, Susane, reported that his mother had wanted him to leave the military.

Button was commissioned through the AFROTC program at New York Institute of Technology in Old Westbury, New York, where he received a degree in aerospace engineering in 1990. He spent four years at the Laughlin Air Force Base in Texas as a Cessna T-37 Tweet first assignment instructor pilot before being transferred to the 355th Fighter Wing, a Fairchild A-10 Thunderbolt II unit at Davis–Monthan Air Force Base in Tucson, Arizona. He had been a USAF pilot for five years before the crash.

Events of April 2, 1997

On April 2, 1997, Captain Button took off in his single-seat A-10 attack aircraft on a training mission with two other A-10s from Davis-Monthan Air Force Base. His jet was armed with 4 Mark 82 bombs, 60 magnesium flares, and 120 metal chaff canisters, and its GAU-8 Avenger gun was loaded with 575 rounds of 30-millimeter ammunition. This training mission would have been the first time Captain Button dropped live ordnance.

Near Gila Bend, Arizona, after being refueled in-flight, Button unexpectedly broke formation. He flew in a northeasterly direction towards the Four Corners area of Arizona, Colorado, New Mexico and Utah. His jet was spotted numerous times by observers on the ground. One observer, an off-duty pilot, said the jet appeared to maneuver around bad weather. This observation suggested to the USAF that the aircraft was being flown manually and purposefully. Button's flight was tracked by radar in Phoenix, Albuquerque, and Denver, but because the transponder in the aircraft was not operating (presumably turned off) it was only tracked, not identified. It was only after analyzing radar data later that investigators were able to track Button's flight.

Button's aircraft zig-zagged near the end of its flight. The jet impacted terrain about  SW of Vail, Colorado, on Gold Dust Peak in a remote part of Eagle County. The USAF concluded the jet probably had two to five minutes of fuel remaining when it crashed. The debris field was over a quarter-mile-square area (0.16 km2). Pieces of the canopy and cockpit went over a ridge.

Sightings

Search and recovery
The search for the crash site was conducted by the USAF, the Colorado Army National Guard and the Civil Air Patrol. A Lockheed U-2 reconnaissance aircraft from Beale Air Force Base in California overflew the area and identified five possible sites. Twenty days after Button's aircraft disappeared, the crew of a National Guard helicopter spotted metal fragments in the snow on Gold Dust Peak. Steep terrain, bad weather, high winds, deep snow, rock slides and avalanches hampered access to the site. Rodents were even found to be chewing through the ropes of recovery personnel. It was several more days before the wreckage was confirmed to be Captain Button's missing A-10. It took another four months to recover human remains.

Status of the bombs

The four  Mk 82 bombs have not been found despite an exhaustive search involving metal detectors and ground-penetrating radar. The bombs were designed to survive a crash and the USAF expected to find them at the site. Furthermore, the aircraft's bomb racks were recovered in the wreckage, and they indicated that the bombs had not been released. Yet, more than four dozen witnesses reported hearing loud explosions in northern Arizona and near Telluride and Aspen, Colorado. However, no evidence was found to support the idea that Button released the weapons where the explosions were heard. The Mk 82 bomb can throw fragments more than a mile (1.6 km), and the crash site was less than 4000 feet (1.2 km) from a deep alpine lake.

In popular culture
Button's story was the inspiration for the plotline of a USAF pilot in the West Wing episode "Noël".

References

External links
 

1964 births
1997 suicides
American military personnel who committed suicide
Aviators killed in aviation accidents or incidents in the United States
New York Institute of Technology alumni
People from Wantagh, New York
Suicides in Colorado
United States Air Force officers
Victims of aviation accidents or incidents in 1997